Nero. is a 1992 Italian black comedy crime film co-written and directed by Giancarlo Soldi. Starring Sergio Castellitto and Chiara Caselli, the screenplay was written by Tiziano Sclavi from a novel of the same name. It follows Frederico and Francesca as they struggle to find a suitably quiet place while carrying Francesca's former boyfriend Zardo cut in pieces in a suitcase.

Plot synopsis 
Frederico's new girlfriend Francesca may have killed her former boyfriend by slitting his throat. Her lover, Frederico, who believes her guilty, tries to help her by making her corpse disappear. But the body really disappears, passing from the trunk of one car to another. His name was Zardo.

Assuming that Francesca killed her former boyfriend and sent him for cleaning up, Frederico cuts him up in pieces, puts him in a suitcase and tries to get rid of it, but he has a hard time finding a suitably quiet place. Unfortunately there's a witness, who comes back on him. One thing leads to another, and the normally shy and overly fearful Frederico has to rid himself of more and more corpses until the film ends.

Cast 

 Sergio Castellitto as Frederico
 Chiara Caselli as Francesca
 Carlo Colnaghi as Contadino
 Luis Molteni as D'Ambrosi
 Hugo Pratt as the Foreign Commissioner

Release 
Nero. premiered in the Venice Film Festival on 6 September 1992, and was released in Italy by Titanus Distribuzione on 18 September 1992. It has since acquired a cult following.

References

External links 

 
 Nero at FilmAffinity
 Nero at the British Film Institute

1992 films
Italian crime comedy films
Italian black comedy films
1992 comedy films
1992 crime films
Titanus films